During the history of the Latter Day Saint movement, the relationship between Black people and Mormonism has included enslavement, exclusion and inclusion, official and unofficial discrimination, and friendly ties. Black individuals have been involved with the Latter Day Saint movement since its inception in the 1830s. Their experiences have varied widely depending on the specific denomination within Mormonism, and the time in history of their involvement. From the mid-1800s to 1978, Mormonism's largest denomination, the Church of Jesus Christ of Latter-day Saints (LDS Church) barred Black women and men from participating in ordinances of its temples necessary for the highest level of salvation, prevented most men of Black African descent from being ordained to the church's lay, all-male priesthood, supported racial segregation in its communities and schools, taught that righteous Black people would be made White after death, and opposed interracial marriage. The racial restrictions were lifted by top leaders in 1978. In 2013 the church disavowed its previous teachings on race for the first time.

The priesthoods of most other Mormon denominations, such as the Bickertonite, and Strangite churches, have always been open to members of all races. In Mormonism's second largest denomination the Community of Christ (formerly known as the Reorganized Church of Jesus Christ of Latter Day Saints or RLDS) there were only a few years Black people were barred from the priesthood. Other, more conservative denominations such as the Fundamentalist Church of Jesus Christ of Latter-Day Saints (FLDS), the Apostolic United Brethren (AUB), and the True and Living Church of Jesus Christ of Saints of the Last Days (TLC) all continued to exclude Black people.

The LDS Church's views on Black people have alternated throughout its history. For example, on teachings about Black slavery, early church leaders went from views of neutrality, to one of anti-slavery, to one of pro-slavery. As early as 1844, leaders suggested that Black people's spirits were less righteous in the pre-existence before birth. Mormonism's founder Joseph Smith and his most influential successor as church president Brigham Young both stated that Black people's skin color was the result of the Curse of Cain and the Curse of Ham. In the 20th century, many top leaders of the LDS Church vocally opposed the civil rights movement. In recent decades the LDS Church has officially condemned racism, and increased its proselytizing and outreach efforts in Black communities. It is still accused of perpetuating implicit racism by not acknowledging, apologizing, or adequately counteracting the effects of its past discriminatory practices and beliefs. Church leaders have worked with the Black civil rights organization the National Association for the Advancement of Colored People (NAACP) since the 2010s, and have donated millions of dollars to Black organizations.

Estimates state that there are between 400,000 and 1 million Black LDS Church members worldwide, and there are at least five operating LDS Church temples in Africa. Fourteen more temples are in some stage of development or construction in the African continent, in addition to several temples among communities of the African diaspora such as the Dominican Republic and Haiti. In the Community of Christ there are congregations in twelve Africa nations, with African membership steadily increasing.

Teachings about Black people

Pre-existence

By 1844 one of the justifications the church leaders used for discriminatory policies was the belief that the spirits of Black individuals before earth life were "fence sitters" when choosing between God or the devil, or were simply less virtuous than White ones. Brigham Young rejected this pre-existence explanation, but the apostles Orson Pratt, Orson Hyde, and John Taylor all supported the concept, and it gained widespread acceptance among members. Formally, this justification appeared as early as 1908 in a church magazine. The apostle Joseph Fielding Smith supported the idea in 1931 and 1954 publications stating that restrictions on Black people were a "punishment" for actions in the pre-existence. In a 1947 response letter the First Presidency wrote that Black people were not entitled to the full blessings of the gospel, and referenced the "revelations [...] on the preexistence" as a justification. The LDS Church also used this explanation in its 1949 official statement.

In 1952, Lowry published a critique of the racist policy in an article in The Nation which he believed was the first time it was publicized to a wider audience. An address by Mark E. Peterson was widely circulated by religious faculty at Brigham Young University (BYU) in the 1950s and 1960s and they used the "less valiant in the pre-existence" explanation to justify racial segregation, a view which Lowell Bennion and Kendall White, among other members, heavily criticized. A 1959 report by the U.S. Commission on Civil Rights found that the LDS Church in Utah generally taught that non-White people had inferior performance in the pre-earth life.

After the temple and priesthood ban was lifted in 1978, church leaders refuted the belief that Black people were less valiant in the pre-existence. In a 1978 interview with Time magazine, Spencer W. Kimball stated that the LDS Church no longer held to the teachings that those of Black ethnicity were any less valiant in the pre-earth life.

In a 2006 interview for the PBS documentary The Mormons, apostle Jeffrey R. Holland called the previous church teachings that Black people were less valiant in the pre-existence an inaccurate racial "folklore" invented in order to justify the temple and priesthood ban, and stated that the reasons for the previous ban were unknown. For the first time the church disavowed its previous teachings on race in 2013, and explicitly denounced any justification for the temple and priesthood restriction based on any events which occurred in the pre-mortal life.

Curses of Cain and Ham

Teachings on the curse of Cain, the curse of Ham, and their relation to Black people have changed throughout the church's history. Its first two leaders Joseph Smith and Brigham Young both referred to the curse of Ham as a justification for Black enslavement at some point in their lives. Smith believed that dark skin marked people of Black African ancestry as cursed by God. In his revisions of the King James Bible, and production of the Book of Abraham he traced their cursed state back to the curses placed on Cain and Ham, and linked the two in the Book of Abraham by positioning Ham's Canaanite posterity as matrilinear descendants of Cain.

Young during Smith's leadership seemed open to Black people holding the priesthood. Later as Smith's successor he used the biblical curses as justification of barring Black men from the priesthood, banning interracial marriages, and opposing Black voting rights. He stated that the curse would one day be lifted and that Black people would be able to receive the priesthood sometime after death.

According to the Bible, God cursed Adam's son Cain and put a mark on him after Cain killed Abel, though the Bible does not state what the nature of the mark was. Smith's canonized scripture the Pearl of Great Price describes the mark of Cain as dark skin, and church president Brigham Young stated, "What is the mark [of Cain]? You will see it on the countenance of every African you ever did see". In another biblical account, Adam's eighth great-grandson Ham discovered his father Noah drunk and naked in his tent. Because of this, Noah cursed his grandson Canaan (Ham's son) to be "servants of servants". Although LDS scriptures do not mention the skin color of Ham or that of his son Canaan, some church teachings associated the Hamitic curse with Black people and used it to justify the enslavement of Black people.

In 1978, when the church ended the temple and priesthood ban, apostle Bruce R. McConkie taught that the ancient curses of Cain and Ham were no longer in effect. In 2013 church leaders disavowed the idea that Black skin was the sign of a curse for the first time.

Righteous Black people would become White

Early church leaders believed that souls of everyone in the celestial kingdom (the highest degree of heaven) would be "[W]hite in eternity." They often equated Whiteness with righteousness, and taught that originally God made his children White in his own image. Smith reported that in his vision Jesus had a "white complexion" and "blue eyes", a description confirmed in another reported vision by follower Anson Call. A 1959 report by the U.S. Commission on Civil Rights found that most Utah Mormons believed "by righteous living, the dark-skinned races may again become [W]hite and delightsome." Conversely, the church also taught that White apostates would have their skins darkened when they abandoned the faith, and until at least the 1960s in the temple endowment ceremony Satan was said to have black skin.

Several Black Mormons were told that they would become White. Hyrum Smith told Jane Manning James that God could give her a new lineage, and in her patriarchal blessing promised her that she would become "[W]hite and delightsome". In 1836 Elijah Abel was similarly promised he would "be made ... [W]hite in eternity". Darius Gray, a prominent Black Mormon, was told that his skin color would become lighter. In 1978, apostle LeGrand Richards stated that the curse of dark skin for wickedness and promise of White skin through righteousness only applied to Native Americans, and not to Black people.

In 2013, the LDS Church published an essay refuting these ideas, describing prior church teachings justifying the restriction as racial "folk beliefs". It stated that Blackness in Latter-day Saint theology is a symbol of disobedience to God and not necessarily a skin color. One youth Sunday School teacher was removed from their position for teaching from this essay in 2015.

Joseph Smith's beliefs 

Joseph Smith's views on Black People varied during his lifetime. As founder of the Latter Day Saint movement he included Black people in many ordinances and priesthood ordinations, but held multi-faceted views on racial segregation, the curses of Cain and Ham, and shifted his views on slavery several times, eventually coming to take an anti-slavery stance later in his life.

Smith on slavery
Initially, Smith expressed opposition to slavery, but, after the church was formally organized in 1830, Smith avoided any discussion of the controversial topic. During the Missouri years, Smith attempted to maintain peace with the members' pro-slavery neighbors, and in 1835, the church decleared it was not "right to interfere with bond-servants, nor baptize them contrary to the will and wish of their masters" nor cause "them to be dissatisfied with their situations in this life." In 1836, Smith published an essay sympathetic to the pro-slavery cause, arguing against a possible "race war", providing cautious justification for slavery based on the biblical Curse of Ham, and stating that Northerners had no "more right to say that the South shall not hold slaves, than the South have to say that the North shall." During the Nauvoo settlement, Smith began preaching abolitionism and the equality of the races. In his presidential campaign, Smith called for "the break down [of] slavery", and wished to free all enslaved persons by 1850.

Smith on temple and priesthood access

Smith was apparently present at the priesthood ordination of Elijah Abel, a multi-ethnic, man of partial Black heritage, to the offices of both elder and seventy, and allowed for the ordination of a couple of other Black men into the priesthood of the early church. Though Black priesthood holder Elijah Able received his washing and anointing temple ordinance under Smith, he did not receive the temple endowments, and his petition for them was denied over thirty years later, and there is no record of any Black individuals receiving the Nauvoo endowment. After his death, Smith's successor Brigham Young barred Black people from temple endowments and marriage sealings, and from receiving the priesthood. There is no contemporary evidence that would suggest the anti-Black priesthood restriction originated with Joseph Smith.  After Smith's death most other Latter-day Saint churches remained open to the ordination of Black people into the priesthood.

Smith on equality and segregation
Smith argued that Black and White people would be better off if they were "separate but legally equal", at times advocating for segregation. He once stated, "Had I anything to do with the negro, I would confine them by strict law to their own species, and put them on a national equalization." He also said, "They have souls, and are subjects of salvation. Go into Cincinnati or any city, and find an educated negro, who rides in his carriage, and you will see a man who has risen by the powers of his own mind to his exalted state of respectability."

Temple and priesthood restriction

Though a few Black men had been ordained to the priesthood under Smith before his death in 1844, by 1849 and continuing until 1978, the Brighamite LDS Church prohibited anyone with real or suspected Black ancestry from taking part in ordinances in its temples, serving in any significant church callings, serving missions, attending priesthood meetings, being ordained to any priesthood office, speaking at firesides, or receiving a lineage in their patriarchal blessing. Non-Black spouses of Black people were also prohibited from entering temples. Before 1849 a few Black men had been ordained to the priesthood under Smith. Over time, the ban was relaxed so that Black people could attend priesthood meetings and some people with a "questionable lineage" were given the priesthood, such as Fijians, Indigenous Australians, Egyptians, as well as some Brazilians and South Africans with unknown heritage who did not appear to have any Black heritage. In 1978, the church's First Presidency released "Official Declaration 2" which lifted the racial restrictions; this was later adopted as scripture.

During the over 120-year span of the restrictions, the church stated they were instituted by God and offered several official race-based explanations for them, including the belief that Cain and his descendants are cursed, that Ham's marriage to Egyptus put a curse on Canaan's descendants, and that Black people were less valiant in their pre-mortal life. Leaders used LDS scriptures to justify their explanations, including the Book of Abraham which teaches that the descendants of Canaan were [B]lack, and the Pharaoh could not have the priesthood because he was one of Canaan's descendants. Since 2013 these previous explanations are no longer accepted as official church teachings and the church teaches anti-racism.

History

During the early years of the Latter Day Saint movement, at least two Black men held the priesthood and became priests: Elijah Abel and Walker Lewis. Elijah Abel received both the priesthood office of elder and the office of seventy, evidently in the presence of Joseph Smith himself. Later, the person who ordained Abel, Zebedee Coltrin stated that in 1834 Smith had told him, "the Spirit of the Lord saith the Negro had no right nor cannot hold the Priesthood," and that Abel should be dropped from the Seventies because of his lineage. In 1908 church president Joseph F. Smith (a nephew of the church founder) said that Abel's ordination had been declared null and void by his uncle personally. Prior to this statement, he had denied any connection between the temple and priesthood ban and Joseph Smith. Historians Armand Mauss and Lester Bush found that all references to Smith supporting a priesthood ban on Black men were made long after his death. They wrote that statements on Smith's support of the ban were the result of reconciliation attempts by later church leaders after his death, made to square the differing policies of Smith and those of his successor Young. Sources suggest there were several other Black priesthood holders in the early church, including Peter Kerr and Jamaican immigrant Joseph T. Ball. Other prominent Black members of the early church included Jane Manning James, Green Flake, and Samuel D. Chambers.

After Smith's death in 1844 and a six-month succession crisis, Young became leader of the majority of Smith's adherents and led the Mormon pioneers to what would become the Utah Territory. Like many American leaders at the time, Young, promoted discriminatory views about Black people as territorial governor. In 1852, Young made a pronouncement to the Utah Territorial Legislature that "any man having one drop of the seed of [Cain] ... in him [could not] hold the priesthood." Young added that after death once all other children of God had received the priesthood that the curse of Cain would be lifted and Black people would "have [all] the privilege and more" that was enjoyed by other members of the church. Some scholars have suggested that the actions of William McCary, a half-Black man who called himself a prophet and the successor to Joseph Smith, led to Young's decision to ban Black men from receiving the priesthood. Young taught in 1855 that Black people's position as "servant of servants" was a law under heaven and that it was not the church's place to change God's law.

Under the racial restrictions that lasted from Young's presidency until 1978, persons with any Black African ancestry could not receive church priesthood or any temple ordinances including the endowment and eternal marriage or participate in any proxy ordinances for the dead. An important exception to this temple ban was that (except for a complete temple ban period from the mid-1960s until the early 70s under McKay) Black members had been allowed limited temple access to act as proxies in baptisms for the dead. The priesthood restriction was particularly limiting, because the LDS Church has a lay priesthood, and most male members over the age of 12 received the priesthood. Holders of the priesthood officiate at church meetings, perform blessings of healing, and manage church affairs. By excluding Black men from the priesthood it meant that they could not hold any significant church leadership roles or participate in important rites such as performing a baptism, blessing the sick, or giving a baby blessing. Between 1844 and 1977, most Black people were not permitted to participate in ordinances performed in the LDS Church temples, such as the endowment ritual, celestial marriages, and family sealings. These ordinances are considered essential to enter the highest degree of heaven, so this exclusion meant that Black people were banned from exaltation. As Black people were banned from having a temple marriage prior to 1978, some leaders interpreted this to mean they would be treated like unmarried White people after death, being limited to living forever as just ministering servants. Apostles George F. Richards and Mark E. Petersen taught that Black people could not achieve exaltation because of the priesthood and temple restrictions. Several leaders, including Joseph Smith, Brigham Young, Wilford Woodruff, George Albert Smith, David O. McKay, Joseph Fielding Smith, and Harold B. Lee taught that Black people would eventually be able to receive salvation, without explicity stating this salvation would include the high status of exaltation.

Patriarchal blessing
In the LDS Church, a patriarch gives patriarchal blessings to members describing their strengths and weaknesses and advising what the future holds for them. The blessings also tell members which biblical tribe of Israel they are descended from. Members who are told they aren't literally descended from a tribe are adopted into one, usually that of Ephraim. In the 19th and early 20th centuries, members were more likely to believe they were literally descended from a certain tribe of Israel. The LDS Church keeps copies of all patriarchal blessings. In Elijah Abel's 1836 patriarchal blessing, no lineage was declared, but he was promised in the afterlife he'd be equal to his fellow members. Jane Manning James's blessing in 1844 gave the lineage of Ham. Later, it became church policy not to declare any lineage for Black members. In 1934, patriarch James H. Wallis wrote in his journal that he had always known that Black people could not receive a patriarchal blessing because of the temple and priesthood ban, but that they could, however, receive one without a lineage. In Brazil, this was interpreted by leaders to mean that if a patriarch pronounced a lineage, then the member was not a descendant of Cain and therefore eligible for the priesthood, despite any physical or genealogical evidence of Black African ancestry.

In 1961, the Church Historian's Office reported that lineages had been given to some Black members in their patriarchal blessings, including the lineage of Cain. A decade later it became church policy from the Presiding Patriarch that no non-Israelite tribes should be given as a lineage in a patriarchal blessing. In a 1980 address to BYU students James E. Faust told them if they had no declared lineage in their patriarchal blessing, that the Holy Ghost would "purge out the old blood, and make [them] actually of the seed of Abraham." After the 1978 revelation patriarchs sometimes did, and sometimes did not declare lineages for Black members. Some Black members since then asked for and received a new patriarchal blessings which included a lineage.

Direct commandment of God (Doctrine) vs. Policy
Church leaders taught for over a century that the priesthood ordination and temple ordinance ban was commanded by God. Young stated it was a "true eternal principle the Lord Almighty has ordained." In 1949, the First Presidency under George Albert Smith released an official statement saying the restriction "remains as it has always stood" and was "not a matter of the declaration of a policy but of direct commandment from the Lord". A second First Presidency statement twenty years later under David O. McKay re-emphasized that the "seeming discrimination by the Church towards the Negro is not something which originated with man; but goes back into the beginning with God". As president of the church, Spencer W. Kimball stated in 1973 that the ban was "not my policy or the Church's policy. It is the policy of the Lord who has established it."

On the topic of doctrine versus policy on the removal of racial restrictions, the apostle Dallin H. Oaks stated in 1988, "I don't know that its possible to distinguish between policy and doctrine in a church that believes in continuing revelation and sustains its leader as a prophet. ... I'm not sure I could justify the difference in doctrine and policy in the fact that before 1978 a person could not hold the priesthood and after 1978 they could hold the priesthood." The research of historians Armand Mauss, Newell G. Bringhurst, and Lester E. Bush has weakened the idea that the ban was doctrinal. Bush commented that there was, in fact, no record of any revelation received by Young concerning the ban. According to Bush, justifications for Young's policies were developed much later by leaders and scholars of the church. The church has since refuted earlier justifications for the temple and priesthood ban and no longer teaches them as doctrine.

End of the temple and priesthood bans
On June 8, 1978, the LDS Church's First Presidency released an official declaration allowing "all worthy male members of the church [to] be ordained to the priesthood without regard to race or color", and which further allowed Black women and men access to temple endowments and sealings. This was the most significant church policy change in decades. According to the accounts of several of those present, while praying in the Salt Lake Temple the First Presidency and the Quorum of the Twelve Apostles received the revelation to remove the racial restrictions. The apostle McConkie wrote that all present "received the same message" and were then able to understand "the will of the Lord". There were many factors that led up to the change. These included pressure from the NAACP, a growing membership and a temple in Brazil, pressures from member activists, negative publicity, and the need for resolving doctrinal contradictions. Due to the publicity from the publication of Lester Bush's seminal article "Mormonism's Negro Doctrine" in 1973, BYU vice-president Robert Thomas feared that the church would lose its tax-exempt status. The article described the church's racially discriminatory practices in detail, and inspired internal discussion among church leaders as it weakened the idea that the temple and priesthood ban was doctrinal. Some critics say the revelation was a business move to avoid losing church tax-exempt status.

Post 1978 theology regarding the restrictions
The 1978 announcement of the removal of racial restrictions did not give reasons for them, nor did it renounce, apologize for, or present new teachings on them. Because these ideas were not officially repudiated, the justifications, ideas, and beliefs that had sustained the restrictions for generations continue to persist as of 2020. Even after the lifting of restrictions the apostle McConkie continued to teach until his death that Black people were descended from Cain and Ham, and that their curse came from God. His influential book Mormon Doctrine, published by the church-owned Deseret Book, continued to perpetuate these racial teachings until it was discontinued in 2010 despite going through many updated editions. In 2005 a church spokesperson told reporters that despite doctrines continuing to circulate among members about why people are Black, church leaders hadn't seen a need for any statements on the topic since 1978.

In 2012, Randy L. Bott, a BYU professor, suggested that God denied the priesthood to Black men in order to protect them from the lowest rung of hell, since one of few damnable sins is to abuse the exercise of the priesthood. Bott compared the priesthood ban to a parent denying young children the keys to the family car, and stated, "You couldn't fall off the top of the ladder, because you weren't on the top of the ladder. So, in reality the [B]lacks not having the priesthood was the greatest blessing God could give them." The church responded saying those views do not represent the church's doctrine or teachings, and that BYU professors do not speak on its behalf. The next year the church officially disavowed teachings that Black skin was a sign of a curse for the first time.

In a 2016 landmark survey, almost two-thirds of 1,156 self-identified Latter-day Saints reported believing the pre-1978 temple and priesthood ban was "God's will". Non-White members of the church were almost 10% more likely to believe that the ban was "God's will" than White members.

In 2022 BYU professor and Young Men general presidency member Brad Wilcox was criticized about parts of a speech in which he downplayed and disrespected concerns about the priesthood and temple ban. Though Wilcox issued two apologies, reporter Jana Riess wrote that his scornful tone and words revealed that he "felt disdainful toward women" and that he believed "God is a racist". Riess called his apologies "not-quite-apologies" and stated they did not go far enough. Videos have surfaced of at least two other instances of Wilcox making similar speeches. W. Paul Reeve stated on the controversy that as of 2022 church leaders have still not clarified whether or not the original ban was divinely inspired, and have not disavowed the actual racial restrictions themselves, thus, resulting in members like Wilcox making controversial remarks.

Racial policies

Slavery 

Initial Mormon converts were from the North and opposed slavery which caused contention in the slave-allowing state of Missouri. Subsequently, church leadership began distancing itself from abolitionism and sometimes justified the enslavement of Black people through Biblical teachings. During this time, several White people who enslaved Black individuals joined the church and brought their enslaved people with them when they moved to Nauvoo, Illinois. The church taught against influencing enslaved persons to be "dissatisfied with their condition". Eventually, contention between the mostly-abolitionist Latter-day Saints and slave-owning Southerners led to the Mormon expulsion from Jackson County, Missouri in the Missouri Mormon War.

Joseph Smith began his presidential campaign on a platform for the government to buy enslaved people into freedom over several years. He called for "the break down of slavery" and the removal of "the shackles from the poor [B]lack man", but was killed during his presidential campaign.

After Smith's death in 1844, most Latter-day Saints followed Young to Utah in 1847, which was part of the Mexican province of Alta California until 1848. Some Black enslaved people were brought to Utah, though some escaped. Brigham Young began teaching that enslaving people was ordained of God, but remained opposed to creating a slavery-based economy in Utah like that seen in the South.

In 1852, the Utah Territory, under the governance of Brigham Young, legalized the purchasing of Black people and Native Americans for enslavement. Under his direction, Utah passed laws supporting this enslavement and making it illegal for Black people to vote, hold public office, join the local military, or marry White people. The slavery laws of Utah contrasted with the existing statutes of the Southern states, in that it only allowed for an enslavement more similar to indentured servitude than to the mass plantation slavery of the South. Twenty-six Black people were held as slaves in the Utah Territory according to the 1850 census, and twenty-nine were reported in the one from 1860. Similar to the policies of other territories, one objective of the slavery laws was to prevent Black people from settling in Utah and to control those that remained.

Many prominent members of the church enslaved people, including William H. Hooper, Abraham O. Smoot, Charles C. Rich, Brigham Young and Heber C. Kimball. Members bought and sold people as property, gave the church enslaved people as tithing, and recaptured individuals who had escaped from slavery. In California, slavery was illegally tolerated in the Mormon community of San Bernardino, despite California laws banning the practice. After the Civil War the US government freed enslaved people and allowed many Black adults to vote. By the early 1920s there were hundreds of members of the Ku Klux Klan (KKK) in Utah. Although Church leaders were against the KKK, there were several LDS members involved in the organization.

Civil rights and church relations with the NAACP 

After the Civil War, little changed on church stances towards Black people and their rights until the civil rights movement in the 1960s. The NAACP, criticized the church's position on civil rights, led anti-discrimination marches and filed a lawsuit against the church in response to its practice of not allowing Black children to be Boy Scout troop leaders. Students from other schools protested against BYU's discriminatory practices church's racial restrictions. In response, the Church issued a statement supporting civil rights and changed its Boy Scout leader policy. The apostle Ezra Taft Benson criticized the civil rights movement and challenged accusations of police brutality. Black athletes at some schools protested against BYU's discriminatory practices by refusing to play against BYU teams. After the reversal of the temple and priesthood ban in 1978, LDS leaders stayed relatively silent on matters of civil rights for a time. Eventually, they began meeting with and formed a partnership with the NAACP.

Beginning in 2017, local church leaders in Mississippi and the NAACP closely worked on projects to restore the NAACP office where Medgar Evers had worked. In 2018, it was announced that the Church and the NAACP would be starting a joint program that provided for the financial education of east-coast residents in larger cities like Baltimore, Atlanta and Camden, New Jersey. In 2019, church president Russell M. Nelson spoke at the national convention of the NAACP in Detroit. In June 2020, a spokesperson for the NAACP stated there was "no willingness on the part of the church to do anything material. ... It's time now for more than sweet talk."

In the church's October 2020 general conference, multiple leaders spoke out against racism and called on church members to take action against it. Church president Nelson asked church members to "lead out in abandoning attitudes and actions of prejudice." The same month in a speech at BYU the apostle Dallin H. Oaks broadly denounced racism, endorsed the message of "Black lives matter" (while discouraging its use to advance controversial proposals), and called on church members to root out racist attitudes, behaviors and policies.

Segregation 

During the first century of its existence, the church discouraged social interaction or marriage with Black people, and encouraged racial segregation in its congregations, facilities, and university, in medical blood supplies, and in public schools. Joseph Smith supported segregation, stating, "I would confine them [Black people] by strict law to their own species". Until 1963, many church leaders supported legalized racial segregation with David O. McKay, J. Reuben Clark, Henry D. Moyle, Ezra Taft Benson, Joseph Fielding Smith, Harold B. Lee, and Mark E. Peterson being leading proponents of it.

During the years, different Black families were either told by church leadership not to attend church or chose not to attend church after White members complained. The church also advocated for segregation laws and enforced segregation in its facilities such as its Hotel Utah and Tabernacle performances. Church leaders counseled members to buy homes so Black people would not move next to LDS chapels. In 1954, apostle Mark E. Petersen taught that segregation was inspired by God. Leaders also advocated for the segregation of donated blood, concerned that giving White members blood from Black people might disqualify them from the priesthood. Church leaders opposed desegregation in public schools, and in its church-run BYU.

Interracial marriage

Nearly every decade for over a century—beginning with the church's formation in the 1830s until the 1970s—saw some denunciations of miscegenation, with most of them focusing on Black–White marriages. The church's stance against interracial marriage held consistent for over a century while attitudes towards Black people and the priesthood and equal rights saw considerable changes. Church leaders' views stemmed from the temple and priesthood policies and racist "biological and social" principles of the time.

Under Smith's leadership in Nauvoo it was against the law for Black men to marry White women, and he fined two Black men for violating his prohibition of interracial marriage. On at least three occasions (1847, 1852, and 1865) Smith's successor Brigham Young publicly taught that the punishment for Black–White interracial marriages was death, and the killing of a Black–White interracial couple and their children as part of a blood atonement would be a blessing to them. He also stated if the Church were to approve of White intermarriage with Black people it would go on to destruction and the priesthood would be taken away.

Opposition to interracial relations continued, and by 1946 J. Reuben Clark called racial intermarriage a "wicked virus" in the church's official magazine, and later stated the church discouraged social interaction with Black people since it could lead to marriage and interracial children. The next year the First Presidency stated in a private letter that marriage between a Black person and a White person is "most repugnant" and "does not have the sanction of the Church and is contrary to church doctrine".

In 1958, church general authority Bruce R. McConkie published Mormon Doctrine in which he stated that "the whole negro race have been cursed with a Black skin, the mark of Cain, so they can be identified as a caste apart, a people with whom the other descendants of Adam should not intermarry." The quote remained until the church ceased printing the book in 2010. Until at least the 1960s, the church penalized White members who married Black individuals by prohibiting both spouses from entering temples.

Utah's anti-miscegenation law was repealed in 1963 by the Utah state legislature, and four years later the US Supreme Court ruled that any prohibition of interracial marriages in the US was unconstitutional. Fifteen years later the temple and priesthood ban was lifted in 1978, but the church still officially discouraged any marriage across ethnic lines, though it no longer banned or punished it. Until 2013 at least one official church manual in use had continued encouraging members only to marry other members of the same race.

Racial attitudes

Between the 19th and mid-20th centuries, some Mormons held racist views, and exclusion from temple and priesthood rites was not the only discriminatory practice towards Black people. For example, while mayor of Nauvoo, Smith barred them from holding office or joining the Nauvoo Legion military. Young taught that equality efforts were misguided, stating that those who fought for equality among Black people were trying to elevate them "to an equality with those whom Nature and Nature's God has indicated to be their masters, their superiors".

A 1959 nationwide report by the US Commission found that Black people experienced widespread inequality in Utah, and Mormon teachings were used to justify racist treatment of Black people. During the 1960s and 1970s, Mormons in the western United States were close to averages in the United States in racial attitudes. American racial attitudes caused difficulties when the church tried to apply the one-drop rule to other ethnically diverse areas like Brazil where many members didn't understand American classifications of race and how it applied to the temple and priesthood ban, causing a rift between missionaries and members.

Anti-Black jokes commonly circulated among Mormons before the 1978 revelation. By the early 1970s, apostle Spencer W. Kimball began preaching against racism calling intolerance by church members "despicable". In a study covering 1972 to 1996, church members in the United States were shown to have lower rates of approval of segregation than other groups in the United States, as well as a faster decline in approval of segregation over the periods covered.

Today, the church actively opposes racism among its membership, and is working to reach out to Black communities, and hosts several predominantly Black wards inside the United States. In 2017, the LDS Church released a statement condeming racism in response to the white nationalist Unite the Right rally in Virginia. One Alt-right church member and blogger argued that the statement was non-binding since it only came from the Public Relations Department rather than the First Presidency.

Opposition to race-based policies
In the second half of the 20th century some White church members protested against teachings and policies excluding Black members from temple ordinances and the priesthood. For instance, three members, John Fitzgerald, Douglas A. Wallace, and Byron Marchant, were all excommunicated by the LDS Church in the 1970s for publicly criticizing these teachings (in the years 1973, 1976, and 1977 respectively). In 1976, Wallace, a high priest in the Church ordained a Black man, Larry Lester, as an Aaronic priest in an effort to force the LDS church to review its doctrines. The ordination was declared void because Wallace had not received prior authorization for the ordination. The next day, he attempted to enter the general conference to stage a demonstration. He was then legally barred from the following October conference, and his house was put under police surveillance during the subsequent April 1977 conference at the request of the LDS church and the FBI. Marchant was excommunicated for signaling the first "opposed" vote in modern church history during the sustaining of the church president in that conference. His vote was motivated by the temple and priesthood ban. He had also received previous media attention from a 1974 lawsuit that changed the church's policy banning even non-Mormon Black Boy Scouts from acting as patrol leaders.

Other White members who publicly opposed somenchurch teachings and policies around Black people included Grant Syphers and his wife, who were denied access to the temple over their objections, with their San Francisco bishop stating that "Anyone who could not accept the Church's stand on Negroes ... could not go to the temple." Their stake president agreed and they were denied the temple recommend renewal. Additionally, Prominent LDS politician Stewart Udall (then acting as the United States Secretary of the Interior) wrote a strongly worded public letter in 1967 criticizing church racial restrictions. to which he received hundreds of critical response letters, including ones from apostles Delbert Stapley and Spencer Kimball.

Racial discrimination after the 1978 revelation
LDS historian Wayne J. Embry interviewed several Black LDS Church members in 1987 and reported that all the participants reported "incidents of aloofness on the part of [W]hite members, a reluctance or a refusal to shake hands with them or sit by them, and racist comments made to them." Embry further reported that one Black woman attended church for three years, despite being completely ignored by fellow congregants. He stated that "she had to write directly to the president of the LDS Church to find out how to be baptized" because none of the other congregants would tell her.

After the end of the temple and priesthood ban in 1978, and proclamations from church leadership extolling diversity, racist beliefs in the church continued. White church member Eugene England, a professor at Brigham Young University, wrote in 1998 that most Mormons still held deeply racist beliefs, including the belief that Black people were descended from Cain and Ham and subject to their curses. England's students at BYU who reported holding these beliefs stated they had learned them from their parents or from instructors at church, and did not know they contradicted current church teachings. In 2003, Black LDS Church member Darron Smith noticed a similar problem, and wrote in Sunstone about the persistence of racist beliefs in the LDS church. Smith wrote that racism persisted in the church because church leadership had not addressed the ban's origins. This racism persisted in the beliefs that Black people were descendants of Cain, that they were neutral in the war in heaven, and that skin color was tied to righteousness. In 2007, journalist and church member, Peggy Fletcher Stack, wrote that Black Mormons still felt separate from other church members because of how other members treat them, ranging from being called them the "n-word" in the church and temple, to small differences in treatment. The lack of Black people in LDS Church leadership also contributed to Black members' feelings of not belonging.

In 2016 a leader of the LDS-sponsored Black organization Genesis Group, Alice Faulkner Burch, said Black members "still need support to remain in the church—not for doctrinal reasons but for cultural reasons." Burch added that "women are derided about our hair ... referred to in demeaning terms, our children mistreated, and callings withheld." When asked what Black women in the church wanted Burch recounted that one woman had told her she wished "to be able to attend church once without someone touching my hair."

In 2020, a printed church Sunday school manual contained teachings about "dark skin" in the Book of Mormon being "the sign of [a] curse", which "curse was the withdrawal of the Spirit of the Lord". Public pressure led the church to change the manual's digital version which subsequently stated the nature and appearance of the mark of dark skin are not fully understood. A few days later, Elder Gary E. Stevenson told a Martin Luther King Day gathering of the NAACP that he was "saddened" by the "error", adding that the Church was "asking members to disregard the paragraph in the printed manual." BYU law professor Michalyn Steele, a Native American, later expressed concern about the church's editorial practice and dismay that church educators continue to perpetuate racism.

In the summer of 2020, Nelson issued a joint statement with three top leaders of the NAACP condemning racism and calling for all institutions to work to remove any lingering racism. In the October 2020 general conference, Nelson, his first counselor Dallin H. Oaks, and the apostle Quentin L. Cook all denounced racism in their speeches.

In response to a 2016 survey of self-identified Mormons, over 60% expressed that they either know (37%) or believe (25.5%) that the priesthood and temple ban was God's will, with another 17% expressing that it might be true, and 22% saying they know or believe it was not God's will.

Black membership

The first statement regarding proselyting towards Black people was about enslaved Black individuals. In 1835, the Church's policy was to not proselyte to Black people held in slavery unless they had permission from their enslavers. This policy was changed in 1836, when Smith wrote that enslaved people should not be taught the gospel at all until after their owners were converted. Though the church had an open membership policy for all races, they avoided opening missions in areas with large Black populations, discouraged people with Black ancestry from investigating the church, counseled members to avoid social interactions with Black people, and instructed Black members to segregate themselves when White members complained of having to worship with them. Relatively few Black people who joined the church retained active membership prior to 1978.

Proselytization

Bruce R. McConkie stated in his 1966 Mormon Doctrine that the "gospel message of salvation is not carried affirmatively to [Black people], although sometimes negroes search out the truth." Despite interest from a few hundred Nigerians, proselyting efforts were delayed in Nigeria in the 1960s. After the Nigerian government stalled the church's visa, apostles decided against proselyting there. In Africa, there were only active missionaries among White people in South Africa. Black people there who requested baptism were told that the church was not working among the them. In the South Pacific, the church avoiding missionary work among native Fijians until 1955 when the church stated they were related to other Polynesian groups and not Black. In Brazil, LDS officials discouraged individuals with Black ancestry from investigating the church. Prior to WWII, proselytization in that country was limited to White German-speaking immigrants. For a time church headquarters had a group of full-time genealogists tasked with determining priesthood and temple eligibility for difficult-to-determine cases. The church instituted a genealogy program to discover Black ancestry, and people's church records were marked if any Black ancestry was discovered. In the 1970s, "lineage lessons" were added to determine if interested persons were eligible for being taught by missionaries. After 1978, there were no restrictions against proselytizing to Black people, and missionaries began entering predominately Black areas of Sub-Saharan Africa.

After 1978

Even though the church does not currently keep official records on the racial makeup of its membership, many estimates of the total worldwide number of Black adherents have been made in the 21st century. These estimates include:
 400,000
 500,000
 over 700,000
 1 million.

Black people have been members of Mormon congregations since the church's founding in the 1830s, but even by 1964 its Black membership was small, with only an estimated 300 to 400 Black members worldwide. In 1970, the church-sanctioned, Black, LDS support group Genesis Group was formed in Salt Lake City, Utah. Since then, Black membership has grown, especially in West Africa, where two temples have been built. In 1990, Helvécio Martins became the first Black general authority of the LDS Church. A 2007 Pew Poll found 3% of LDS respondents in the US identified as Black.

In April 2017, the LDS Church announced plans to build a temple in Nairobi, Kenya, bringing the number of temples planned or built in Africa (outside South Africa) to six. In 2017, two Black South African men were called to serve as mission presidents. Under President Russell M. Nelson, the pace of announcement of new temples across Africa picked up. During his first two years as president of the Church, five additional temples were announced for Africa, including two in Nigeria (bringing that country to a total of three temples in some stage of operation or planning), one in the Democratic Republic of the Congo (which was the quickest announcement of a second temple after the dedication of the first for any country other than the United States), and the first temples in Sierra Leone and Cape Verde. Nelson also announced temples in San Juan, Puerto Rico and Salvador, Brazil, both places where large percentages of both church members and the overall population were of Black.

In 2009, professor Philip Jenkins stated that in Africa, the growth of the LDS Church has been slower than the growth of other churches due to the White face of the church (a result of the temple and priesthood ban), and the church's refusal to accommodate local customs like polygamy.

As of 2020, there had been six men of Black African descent who have been called general authorities and there has been one Black man of African descent appointed as a general officer of the LDS Church. Of these seven men, one was called while Ezra Taft Benson was president of the Church, two during Thomas S. Monson's ten-year tenure as president of the church and four during the first two years Russell M. Nelson was president of the Church.

Other Latter Day Saint groups' positions

Community of Christ

Joseph Smith III, the son of Joseph Smith, founded the Reorganized Church of Jesus Christ of Latter Day Saints in 1860, now known as the Community of Christ. Smith was a vocal advocate of abolishing the slave trade, and a supporter of Owen Lovejoy, an anti-slavery congressman from Illinois, and Abraham Lincoln. He joined the Republican Party and advocated its anti-slavery politics. He rejected the fugitive slave law, and openly stated that he would assist people who tried to escape enslavement. He was a strong opponent of slavery, yet he viewed White people as superior to Black people, and held the view that they must not "sacrifice the dignity, honor and prestige that may be rightfully attached to the ruling races." The priesthood was not available to Black people between 1860 and 1865, and the first Black man was not ordained to the priesthood until 1893. The Community of Christ rejects the Pearl of Great Price. As of 2020 the church has congregations in twelve Africa nations, with Black African membership steadily increasing, despite the Western decline in membership.

Fundamentalist Church of Jesus Christ of Latter-Day Saints

The president of the Fundamentalist Church of Jesus Christ of Latter-Day Saints (FLDS) Warren Jeffs has made several anti-Black public statements since 2002. These included saying that the devil brings evil to the earth through Black people, that Cain is the father of the Black race, that people with "Negro blood" aren't worthy of the priesthood, that Black-White marriage is evil, and that even marrying someone who has "connections with a Negro" would bring a curse.

Apostolic United Brethren
The Apostolic United Brethren (AUB) is a Utah-based, Latter Day Saint, polygamous, fundamentalist group that separated itself in 1929. As of 2018 they continue to deny temple and priesthood rites to people with Black heritage, and teach that Black people are "Canaanites" and under the curse of Cain. In 1978 when the LDS church removed the racial restrictions, a reported dozens to hundreds of families left the LDS church for the AUB.

Bickertonite

The Church of Jesus Christ (Bickertonite) was founded by William Bickerton (and received many Rigdonite followers from Sidney Rigdons branch of Mormonism). It has advocated full racial integration throughout all aspects of the church since its organization in 1862. In 1905, the church suspended an elder for opposing the full integration of all races.

Historian Dale Morgan wrote in 1949: "An interesting feature of the Church's doctrine is that it discriminates in no way against ... members of other racial groups, who are fully admitted to all the privileges of the priesthood. It has taken a strong stand for human rights, and was, for example, uncompromisingly against the Ku Klux Klan during that organization's period of ascendancy after the First World War."

At a time when racial segregation or discrimination was commonplace in most institutions throughout America, two of the most prominent leaders of The Church of Jesus Christ were Black. Apostle John Penn, a member of the Quorum of the Twelve from 1910 to 1955, conducted missionary work among Italian Americans, and he was often referred to as "The Italian's Doctor". Matthew Miller, who was ordained an evangelist in 1937, traveled throughout Canada and established missions to Native Americans. The church had a mission in Nigeria.

Strangite

The Church of Jesus Christ of Latter Day Saints (Strangite) was founded by James Strang in 1844 and welcomed Black people into their church during a time when some other factions denied them the priesthood, and certain other benefits that come with membership in it. Strang ordained at least two Black men to his church's priesthood during his lifetime. Though his ethnicity remains unclear from the historical record, James T. Ball was identified as Black at least once, and joined the Strangites in 1849.

True and Living Church of Jesus Christ of Saints of the Last Days
The Manti, Utah-based True and Living Church of Jesus Christ of Saints of the Last Days (TLC) branched off from the LDS church in 1990 and as of 2008, it adhered to teachings and practices which were similar to the teachings and practices which were historically adhered to by the LDS church, including the Black temple and priesthood ban, the belief that the skin color of apostates would darken, and the practice of polygamy. The TLC's founder James D. Harmston taught his followers that the LDS Church's leader Gordon Hinckley was Cain in a previous life.

See also
 Black people and Mormon priesthood
 Christian views on slavery
 History of African Americans in Utah
 Mormonism and Pacific Islanders
 Mormonism and slavery
 Native American people and Mormonism
 Phrenology and the Latter Day Saint Movement
 Racial segregation of churches in the United States

References

Further reading

External links
 BlackLDS.org – Independent (not church-owned or operated) site maintained by some church members.
 Genesis Group – Church-affiliated organization for serving needs of Black Latter-day Saints.
 Race and the Priesthood – 2013 statement by the LDS Church renouncing previous teachings and stating the Church's current stances.

The Church of Jesus Christ of Latter-day Saints in Africa
History of the Church of Jesus Christ of Latter-day Saints
Religion and race
Christianity and race
Mormonism and race
Brigham Young
Criticism of Mormonism
Anti-black racism in the United States
Harold B. Lee Library-related 19th century articles
Harold B. Lee Library-related 20th century articles